de la Hay is a Scoto-Norman surname. It may refer to:

Gilbert de la Hay  (died April 1333), fifth feudal baron of Errol in Gowrie
Thomas de la Hay (c. 1342 – July 1406), Lord High Constable of Scotland

See also
Hay (surname)
De la Haye (disambiguation) 
Delahaye (disambiguation) 

Surnames of Scottish origin
Surnames of Norman origin